Qaradağlı is a village and municipality in the Barda Rayon of Azerbaijan, situated just north of the capital of the rayon, Barda. It has a population of 1,144.

Notes

Populated places in Barda District